Suberitida is an order of sponges belonging to the class Demospongiae.

Families:
 Halichondriidae
 Stylocordylidae
 Suberitidae

References

Heteroscleromorpha
Sponge orders